Lloyd Binford Ramke (born 19 February 1947, in Port Neches, Texas) is an American poet and editor.

Life
He graduated from Louisiana State University, from University of New Orleans, and from Ohio University with a Ph.D.
He taught at Columbus College.

He was editor of the University of Georgia Press's Contemporary Poetry Series, from 1984 to 2005.

He teaches at the University of Denver. He edited the literary magazine Denver Quarterly from 1994 to 2011.
He lives in Denver with his wife, Linda, a fiction writer, and their son, Nic.

Awards
 1978 Yale Series of Younger Poets Competition
 1994 Iowa Poetry Prize
 1998 Iowa Poetry Prize

Works

Anthologies

Criticism
"Celebrating a World in Danger", Boston Review, 27.5

References

External links
"Noble Rider: A Profile of Bin Ramke", Poets & Writers, September/October 2007
"Bin Ramke", Foetry: American Poetry Watchdog
"Nothing Prior to Anything"; "Hear Here"; "Poor in World", Tarpaulin Sky, Fall/Winter 06
"Was It Fallen It Was a Floating World "; "It Was Fallen Was It a Floating World", Electronic Poetry Review #8
"Who Is Dying", Electronic Poetry Review #8
"Lies", Electronic Poetry Review #8
"The Naming of Shadows and Colors", Electronic Poetry Review #7
"Livery of Seisin", Electronic Poetry Review #1
"Arcade: The Search for a Sufficient Landscape", Poetry Foundation
"Better Late than Never", Poetry Foundation
"Chivalric", Poetry Foundation
"Cinema Verité", Poetry Foundation
"Melting Pot", Poetry Foundation
"The Center for Atmospheric Research", Poetry Foundation
"Trouble Deaf Heaven", Poetry Foundation
"Anomalies of Water"; "Custody of the Eyes"; "How it Feels, and Why", Salt Magazine, Issue 2

American male poets
1947 births
Louisiana State University alumni
University of New Orleans alumni
Ohio University alumni
People from Port Neches, Texas
University of Denver faculty
Living people